Melony Ghee Griffith (born June 5, 1963) is an American politician who represents district 25 in the Maryland Senate.

Background
Griffith was born on June 5, 1963 in Abilene, Texas to Frank F. and Mary E. Ghee and raised on Warren Air Force Base in Cheyenne, Wyoming, and the Malmstrom Air Force Base in Great Falls, Montana. She attended Charles M. Russell High School, Great Falls, Montana and then Eastern Montana College where she earned her B.S. in psychology, criminology and rehabilitation in 1985. In 1987 she graduated from Howard University with a M.S.W.

Senator Griffith is a former licensed clinical social worker and has spent most of the career working to positively impact public health. Continuing her education in 2014, Melony completed the Community Health Leadership Program, through the Satcher Health Leadership Institute, Morehouse School of Medicine. The same year, she received an Honorary Doctorate of Humane Letters from the Virginia University of Lynchburg, School of Liberal Arts.

Currently, she is the deputy director of the Prince George’s Arts and Humanities Council.

In the legislature
Melony Griffth represents District 25 in the Maryland State Senate. In 2020, Senator Griffith became the first African American woman elected as President Pro Tempore for the Maryland Senate. In this role, Griffith serves as the leader of the Senate chamber in the absence of Senate President Bill Ferguson. In addition to serving as President Pro Tempore, Senator Griffith also serves as the Chair of the Budget and Taxation Committee’s Subcommittee on Health and Human Services. 

In April 2022 she signed 103 Maryland measures into law together with Republican Governor Larry Hogan and House Speaker Adrienne A. Jones. It was the first time that two black women had taken part in such a ceremony as Maryland's presiding officers. Jones represented the house while Griffiths as the President pro tem represented the Maryland Senate.

Griffth served as a member of the Maryland House of Delegates from 1999 to 2015. During her tenure as Delegate, she was a member of the House Appropriations Committee, serving as the Chair of the Oversight Committee on Pensions. In this role, Griffith worked to ensure funding for retired teachers, state employees, law enforcement and correction officers. She also served as the Vice Chair of the Capital Budget Subcommittee where she demonstrated a keen understanding of how to partner with local and federal leaders to invest in Prince George’s County, securing millions of dollars in funding for projects benefiting non-profits and neighborhoods.

In December 2009, Senator Griffith had the honor of being elected by 23 of her peers as Chair of the Prince George’s County Delegation. In this capacity, she was the leading voice for the County in Annapolis on key policy issues.

In addition to these roles, Griffith also served on the Child Welfare Work Group, the Maryland State Arts Council, the Maryland Film Industry Coalition, the Joint Committee on Children Youth and Families, and the House Judiciary Committee.

She is a member of the Women's Caucus and Legislative Black Caucus of Maryland.

Legislative notes
Sponsored legislation leading to the Pension Reform creating savings for the State.
Sponsored legislation to advance public art.

References 

1963 births
20th-century African-American people
20th-century African-American women
21st-century African-American politicians
21st-century African-American women
21st-century American politicians
21st-century American women politicians
African-American state legislators in Maryland
African-American women in politics
Democratic Party Maryland state senators
Democratic Party members of the Maryland House of Delegates
Living people
Montana State University Billings alumni
Politicians from Great Falls, Montana
Women state legislators in Maryland